The 1st Central Bureau of the Chinese Communist Party was elected by the 1st National Congress of the Chinese Communist Party in Jiaxing, Zhejiang on July 31, 1921.

Members
Chen Duxiu, Secretary
Zhang Guotao, Director of Organization
Li Da, Director of Propaganda.

External links
 The 1st Central Bureau of the Communist Party of China

Politburo of the Chinese Communist Party
1921 in Asia
1921 in China